CASPR also known as Contactin associated protein 1, Paranodin and CASPR1 is a protein that in humans is encoded by the CNTNAP1 gene.
CASPR is a part of the neurexin family of proteins, hence its another name "Neurexin IV". CASPR is a membrane protein found in the neuronal membrane in the paranodal section of the axon in myelinated neurons, between the Nodes of Ranvier containing Na+ channels, and juxtaparanode, which contains K+ channels. During myelination, caspr associates with contactin in a cis complex, though its precise role in myelination is not yet understood.

Function 
The gene product was initially identified as a 190-kD protein associated with the contactin-PTPRZ1 complex. The 1,384-amino acid protein, also designated p190 or CASPR for 'contactin-associated protein,' includes an extracellular domain with several putative protein-protein interaction domains, a putative transmembrane domain, and a 74-amino acid cytoplasmic domain. Northern blot analysis showed that the gene is transcribed predominantly in brain as a transcript of 6.2 kb, with weak expression in several other tissues tested. The architecture of its extracellular domain is similar to that of neurexins, and this protein may be the signaling subunit of contactin, enabling recruitment and activation of intracellular signaling pathways in neurons. [provided by RefSeq, Jan 2009].

Clinical

Mutations in CNTNAP1 cause arthrogryposis multiplex congenita.

Other diseases associated with mutations in this gene include lethal congenital contracture syndrome type 7 and congenital hypomyelinating neuropathy type 3.

References

Further reading

External links